This list of cemeteries in Ogle County, Illinois includes currently operating, historical (closed for new interments), and defunct (graves abandoned or removed) cemeteries, columbaria, and mausolea which are historical and/or notable. It does not include pet cemeteries.

Brookville Township 
Brookville Township Cemetery also called Evangelical Cemetery
Chambers Grove Cemetery, Shannon

Buffalo Township 
Buffalo Grove Cemetery
St. Mary's Catholic Cemetery
Fairmount Cemetery
Reed Cemetery or Rock Springs Cemetery
William Durley Monument

Byron Township 

Byron Cemetery
St. Mary's Catholic Cemetery

Dement Township 
Woodlawn Cemetery

Eagle Point Township 
Eagle Point Cemetery
Elkhorn Cemetery, also called Brick Church Cemetery
Nichol Cemetery
Webster Cemetery

Flagg Township 
Flagg Center Cemetery
Lawnridge Cemetery
St. Patricks Catholic Cemetery
Trinity Memorial Cemetery

Forreston Township 
Forreston Grove Cemetery
Hewitt Cemetery
Prairie Dell Cemetery
White Oak Cemetery

Grand Detour Township 
Grand Detour Cemetery

LaFayette Township 
Chapel Hill Cemetery

Leaf River Township 
Egan Cemetery
Lightsville Cemetery
North Grove Christian Cemetery
North Grove Evangelical Cemetery

Lincoln Township 

Haldane Cemetery
West Branch Cemetery or Maryland Cemetery
West Grove Cemetery
Lynnville Lindenwood Cemetery

Lynnville Township 
Lindenwood Cemetery

Marion Township 

Stillman's Run Battle Site, Stillman Valley
Mouth Of Stillman Cemetery, Byron
Stillman Valley Cemetery

Maryland Township 
Adeline Cemetery
Adeline U.B. Cemetery
Coffman Cemetery
North Grove Zion Evangelical Reformed Cemetery

Monroe Township 
Bennett Cemetery or Porter Cemetery
Roseland Cemetery or Dutchtown Cemetery
Kilbuck Cemetery
Monroe Center Cemetery

Mt. Morris Township 
Oakwood Cemetery
Plainview Cemetery
Rice Cemetery
Silver Creek Cemetery

Oregon-Nashua Township 
County Farm Cemetery
Daysville Cemetery
Lighthouse Cemetery
Riverside Cemetery
Riverview Cemetery
St. Bride's Episcopal Cemetery
St. Mary's Catholic Cemetery

Pine Creek Township 
Pine Creek Brethren Cemetery
Cedar Hill or Salem Cemetery
Mt. Zion Cemetery
Oak Ridge Cemetery
Evergreen Cemetery or Pine Creek Christian Cemetery
Coffman Farm

Pine Rock Township 
Cooley Cemetery or Seaworth Cemetery
Mt. Pleasant Cemetery
Emmanuel Lutheran Cemetery
Stinsonian Cemetery
Washington Grove Cemetery

Rockvale Township 

Bald Hill Cemetery or Camling Cemetery
Brooklyn Cemetery
Ebenezer Reformed Cemetery
Wertz Cemetery or Jacob Good Farm

Scott Township 
Beach Cemetery
Big Mound Cemetery

White Rock Township 
Bethel Cemetery or Hayes Cemetery
White Rock Cemetery
Lucas Cemetery or Hathaway Cemetery
Chaney Cemetery
Egbert Cemetery or Aubery Brown Cemetery
Stocking Cemetery

See also 

 List of cemeteries in the United States
 List of cemeteries in Illinois
 List of cemeteries in Vermilion County, Illinois

References

External links
Ogle County Cemetery Project
Findagrave.com - Ogle County

Cemeteries
Ogle County
Ogle County, Illinois
Cemeteries in Ogle County
Cemeteries in Illinois by county